North Clackamas Christian School (NCCS) is a private, non-church affiliated Christian school in Oregon City, Oregon, United States.
NCCS offers fine arts programs in choir, band, art, ceramics, drama, and wildlife habitat.
Advanced Placement courses are offered in the high school, as well as concurrent credits through Clackamas Community College
All administrators and teaching staff are Oregon state licensed.

History 
NCCS was founded in 1973 by a group of parents wanting to establish a school with a strong academic program and a Christian culture and worldview.
After purchasing land on a hilltop in Oregon City, volunteers constructed the first six-room building for 93 students and six teachers.
NCCS has since grown into a fully accredited institution with a full-service campus.

The school is governed by a board of directors and overseen by an administrator.

Academics 
NCCS offers accredited K-12 instruction that is fully compliant with Oregon state requirements.
 Fine arts programs in choir, band, art, ceramics, drama, and wildlife habitat.
 Advanced placement courses are offered in the high school, as well as concurrent credits through Clackamas Community College
 Participation in National Honor Society
 All administrators and teaching staff are Oregon state licensed.

Sports

NCCS offers OSAA Division 1A varsity:
 Basketball
 Track and Field
 Soccer
 Volleyball (girls)
 Acapella choir
 Baseball
Most sports are also available at the junior varsity and junior high levels.

State championships
 Boys Basketball: 1983, 1986, 1996, 2004
 Track: 
 2003, 2004, 2005
 2017 Ethan Kassebaum: long jump, triple jump, 200m, and OSAA outstanding Division 1A athlete.
 Acapella Choir: 
 2013, 2016, 2017, 2018, and 2019 Division 1A/2A, performance
 2013 and 2014 first place, All-State Academic Champions, all divisions.

 Top State GPA, Division 1A
 Girls Basketball 2010 (3.8)
 Girls Volleyball 2003, 2014
 Boys Basketball 2013 (3.77)
 Acapella Choir: 2013, 2014, 2015
 Soccer: 2013 (3.66), 2019 (3.74)

Valley 10 League/District Championships 
 Girls Basketball: 2016 Champions
 All-league, 1st team MVP
 All-league, 1st defensive team MVP
 All-league, 2nd team member
 League Coach of the Year: Troy DeVries

Accreditation 
 Association of Christian Schools International since May 2002 
 AdvancED since July 1997

References

High schools in Clackamas County, Oregon
Educational institutions established in 1973
Private middle schools in Oregon
Christian schools in Oregon
Private elementary schools in Oregon
Private high schools in Oregon
1973 establishments in Oregon